{{Infobox person
| name               = Lindsey Morgan
| image              = Lindsey Morgan by Gage Skidmore 2.jpg
| alt                = 
| caption            = Morgan at the 2018 WonderCon
| birth_name         = Lindsey Marie Morgan
| birth_date         = 
| birth_place        = Georgia, U.S.
| other_names        = 
| alma_mater         = University of Texas at Austin
| occupation         = Actress
| years_active       = 2009–present
| notable_works      = The 100Walker

}}

Lindsey Marie Morgan (born February 27, 1990) is an American actress. She is best known for starring as mechanic Raven Reyes on The CW science fiction drama series The 100 (2014–2020), as well as her role as Ranger Michelle "Micki" Ramirez on The CW's Walker, a 2021 reboot of the television series Walker, Texas Ranger.

Early life
Lindsey Marie Morgan was born February 27, 1990, in Georgia, United States, to Gus Morgan and Alice Burciaga. She is of half Mexican and half Irish descent. She has an older brother, a half-sister, and five step-siblings.

Career
2010–2013: Beginnings and General Hospital

Morgan began her career in college at the University of Texas at Austin, then left for Los Angeles to chase her acting dream. Within her first year of college, Morgan stayed busy by continually booking commercials and print ads. She was cast as an extra on the critically acclaimed series Friday Night Lights. Morgan decided to move to Los Angeles to continue her work as an actress. Her first real role was in the movie Detention (2011) starring Josh Hutcherson where she played a mean cheerleader named Alexis. In 2011, she landed the leading role in the MTV film DisCONNECTED (2011) as social media obsessed Maria. "DISconnected" was part of the MTV "A Thin Line" campaign. The film and the campaign were developed in order to empower young people to identify, respond to, and stop the spread of digital abuse in their lives.

On April 17, 2012, TVLine reported that Morgan had been cast as the contract role of Kristina Davis on the American ABC Daytime soap opera General Hospital and would make her debut on May 25, 2012. For this role Morgan was nominated for Daytime Emmy Award for Outstanding Younger Actress in a Drama Series in 2013. Of learning about her Emmy nomination, she said, "I was worried that I'd gotten the call time wrong for my appearance on Franklin & Bash before I saw that it said "Congratulations!, I'm stunned, I'm still so shocked. I'm so honored. On March 26, 2013, it was announced that she would be departing her role as Kristina, last airing on March 4, 2013.

Immediately upon leaving General Hospital, Morgan filmed a web series called Destroy the Alpha Gammas, about which she told TV Source Magazine: "I loved every second of it. I made some great friends and had a great blast doing it."

In 2013, Morgan had a supporting role in the indie movie Chastity Bites (2013).

2014–2020: The 100 and further success

On August 20, 2013, it was announced that Morgan landed a recurring role on The CW science fiction drama series The 100, which ended after seven seasons. For season 2, Morgan was upgraded to series regular.

Morgan describes her character: "Raven is a total badass. She is a guy's girl who is brilliant because she's also a prodigy when it comes to mechanical engineering. She's the youngest mechanical engineer the space station has had in 52 years, and she loves getting dirty and down with it. She's feisty, she's sassy, she's strong; she's a really cool girl. She can definitely hold her own."

In 2015, Morgan filmed her first leading film role starring as Ariana in the television film Casa Vita alongside ABC Family's Baby Daddy star Jean-Luc Bilodeau. Ariana is a Mexican-American cook dreaming of opening her own fusion cuisine restaurant much to her father's dismay. Ariana works at her father's restaurant, Casa Vita, where she meets Early Lindstrom.

On April 18, 2016, Morgan landed a lead role in the independent thriller Lasso'', alongside Andrew Jacobs, Sean Patrick Flanery. Morgan's character holds a huge amount of guilt for not keeping the senior citizens safe and takes on the duty of ensuring their safety throughout the film.

Personal life 

On December 29, 2020, Morgan announced her engagement with actor Shaun Sipos on Instagram.

Filmography

Film

Television

Music videos

Awards and nominations

References

External links

1990 births
21st-century American actresses
American actresses of Mexican descent
American people of Irish descent
American soap opera actresses
Hispanic and Latino American actresses
Living people
People from Houston
University of Texas at Austin alumni